Robert O'Neill or Robert O'Neil may refer to: 

Robert J. O'Neill (born 1976), US Navy SEAL who claims to have fatally shot Osama bin Laden
Robert O'Neill (footballer) (1883–1961), Australian rules footballer
Robert O'Neill (historian) (born 1936), Australian historian and academic
Robert E. O'Neill (fl. 2010s), American attorney
Robert Torrens O'Neill (1845–1910), Irish politician who served in the UK House of Commons
Robert M. O'Neil (1934-2018), American lawyer and president of the University of Virginia
Bob O'Neil, American football player
Bob O'Neill (1905-1978), Australian rules footballer
Robert John O'Neill (bishop), retired Episcopal bishop of Colorado
Mr. Robert O'Neil, a Teenage Mutant Ninja Turtles character

See also
Robert Neill (disambiguation)
Robert O'Neal (disambiguation)